The Ministry of Water Resources (Pāni sampada mantraṇālaẏa) is a ministry of the government of the People's Republic of Bangladesh.

Directorates
Institute of Water Modeling
River Research Institute
Water Resources Planning Organisation (WARPO)
Bangladesh Water Development Board
Bangladesh Haor and Wetland Development Board
Flood Forecasting and Warning Center
Joint River Commission, Bangladesh
Centre for Environmental and Geographic Information Services

References

 
Water Resources
Ministries established in 1972
1972 establishments in Bangladesh
Bangladesh